Ishaq Abdulrazak (born on 5 May 2002) is a Nigerian professional footballer who plays as a midfielder for Anderlecht.

Club career
On 20 June 2022, Abdulrazak left IFK Norrköping to join Belgian First Division A side Anderlecht on a four-year deal.

Career statistics

Club

Notes

References

External links

2002 births
Living people
Nigerian footballers
Nigerian expatriate footballers
Association football midfielders
Allsvenskan players
IFK Norrköping players
Nigerian expatriate sportspeople in Sweden
Expatriate footballers in Sweden
R.S.C. Anderlecht players
Expatriate footballers in Belgium
Nigerian expatriate sportspeople in Belgium